Ernst Nicolaas Herman Jansen, (born 24 October 1945 in Kamperland, Netherlands), later known as Ernst Jansen Steur, is a former Dutch neurologist, who garnered notoriety for misconduct and lost his license to practice medicine.

Career
Ernst Nicolaas Herman Jansen, later known as Ernst Jansen Steur is a Dutch former neurologist who worked in several positions, including the Medisch Spectrum Twente (MST). During his career he was noted within his profession for his research into Alzheimer's disease, Parkinson's disease and multiple sclerosis.

He completed his doctoral research in 1994 at the Maastricht University, researching Parkinson's disease.

Jansen Steur was interviewed as an expert on the disease by the Dutch television program EénVandaag on 24 July 2002 regarding the condition of Prince Claus (Jansen Steur indicated on the show that he found the prince's condition "worrisome").

Jansen Steur suffered a serious car accident in Germany in 1990, resulting in a complex hip fracture. In 2000 he became addicted to midazolam, a benzodiazepine sedative. In order to obtain this drug he started forging prescriptions using his colleagues' names as prescribing physicians.

As it turned out later, in the four years following his becoming addicted, he regularly misdiagnosed patients. In order to support his misdiagnoses, he forged diagnostic questionnaires from patients, swapped patient x-rays and forged laboratory results. He prescribed strong medications unnecessarily for a number of his patients and in a number of cases had patients undergo brain surgery without necessity.

Jansen Steur was forced to resign from the MST by the board in 2004. He received a €250,000 severance package and was forced to sign a non-disclosure agreement (together with his former colleagues). As part of this deal, he agreed to strike himself from the Dutch registry of medical professionals, thereby giving up the right to practice in the Netherlands. Patients received financial compensation, but were sworn to secrecy.

Investigation and prosecution
The Lemstra committee reported on 1 September 2009, concluding failures on the part of the MST but also of the Dutch Health Care Inspectorate (: Inspectie voor de Gezondheidszorg or IGZ), which was headed by Kingma at the time that Jansen was being sent away from the MST. The committee also concluded Jansen had been failing as a doctor since 1992 and that the MST had failed to address the situation for years.

Upon the release of this report, the Dutch minister of Health Ab Klink instituted another investigative committee headed by Rein Jan Hoekstra, to investigate the functioning of the Health Care Inspectorate.

This committee supported the conclusions of the Lemstra committee regarding the failing of the Inspectorate, concluding that the Inspectorate waited far too long to take measures against Jansen and should have filed criminal charges against him rather than settling for a voluntary relinquishing of his status as a physician. They also criticized the MST and the doctors treating Jansen Steur for his injuries in that they did not cooperate fully with the investigation by the Inspectorate. Both of Jansen's doctors invoked physician–patient privilege. However, the Inspectorate concluded in an internal investigation concluded on 17 February 2009 that they had functioned correctly in the matter of Jansen Steur.

It was announced in October 2009 that Jansen Steur would have to face charges in court after all, charges having been leveled by a special investigative team of the police for this case (the Lippstadt-team). The team had, by that point, gathered 135 different complaints from patients regarding Jansen Steur. The justice department called the case "the biggest medical trial in the Netherlands ever".

The trial was started on 28 November 2012; it was announced on this first trial day that Jansen Steur was facing 21 criminal charges, including causing grievous bodily and mental harm through misdiagnoses of eight patients, causing one patient to commit suicide, theft, embezzlement and fraud. A total of 40 people filed charges against the doctor.

There were charges filed by personal injury expert , who filed charges in name of a few dozen injured patients and in name of the families of three patients who died after having been treated by Jansen Steur. In addition to these charges, charges were filed of scientific fraud, after investigation by the Lemstra committee showed that Jansen Steur had falsified results in order to publish an article in The Lancet. The court in Arnhem sentenced him for deliberately setting misdiagnosis, wrongly prescribing strong medicines and the denial of care. In addition he was considered responsible for a suicide of a female patient due to his diagnosis. The court sentenced in February 2014 3 years of prison. Jansen Steur appealed.

Metta de Noo, a physician and acquaintance of Jansen Steur claimed in her book of 2015 that he suffered a frontal lobe disorder due to the 1990 accident and should not be held criminally accountable.

Work in Germany after 2004
After being forced out of the MST in 2004, Jansen Steur moved to Germany, where he worked for several private clinics. After Dutch correspondent Rob Vorkink tracked him down to the Schlossberg Klinik in Bad Laasphe and tried to interview him for RTV Oost, Jansen Steur was immediately fired from that institute.

The Netherlands was shocked on 4 January 2013 when the NOS evening news led with the story that Jansen Steur had found another job as a neurologist in the Klinik am Gesundbrunnen hospital in Heilbronn. He was discovered there by the same Rob Vorkink, who recognized Jansen Steur's voice in a phone call (despite his denying that he was the same person). NOS reporter Marc Hamer verified his identity by passing around photographs among hospital personnel. He was subsequently fired from the hospital on 5 January 2013.

Although the hospital noted at first that Jansen Steur had been allowed to work at the hospital because he left his profession voluntarily in the Netherlands in 2010 (preventing the hospital from checking his credentials with the Dutch registry) and as there were no criminal convictions against him when he applied to the hospital, it soon transpired that the hospital had in fact been aware of Jansens past.

On 6 January 2013, a German patient filed charges over treatment she received from Jansen Steur in Heilbronn, which she claimed left her requiring the use of a wheelchair.

Other
Steur is the doctor's mother's maiden name. He added this name to his surname of "Jansen", which is one of the most common surnames in the Netherlands, and is known to the general public as "Ernst Jansen Steur".

References

External links
German language article treating the question how he was able to work in Germany after getting fired and losing his license as a doctor in the Netherlands, "Wieviel Schuld tragen Klinik und Kammern?", Ärzte Zeitung, 14 January 2013.

Living people
1945 births
Dutch neurologists
Medical scandals
People convicted for health fraud
Medical controversies in the Netherlands